Bob Hewitt and Frew McMillan were the defending champions.

Hewitt and McMillan successfully defended their title, defeating Vitas Gerulaitis and Sandy Mayer 6–4, 6–4 in the final.

Seeds

Draw

Finals

Top half

Bottom half

External links
 Draw

U.S. Pro Indoor
1978 Grand Prix (tennis)